1,2-Butanediol is the organic compound with the formula HOCH(HO)CHCHCH.  It is classified as a vic-diol (glycol).  It is chiral, although typically it is encountered as the racemic mixture.  It is a colorless liquid.

Preparation
This diol was first described by Charles-Adolphe Wurtz in 1859.

It is produced industrially by hydration of 1,2-epoxybutane.

This process requires a ten- to twenty-fold excess of water to suppress the formation of polyethers. Depending on the amount of excess water, the selectivity varies from 70 to 92%. Sulfuric acid or strongly acidic ion exchange resins may be used as catalysts, which allows the reaction to occur under 160 °C and at slightly above atmospheric pressure.

1,2-Butanediol is a byproduct of the production of 1,4-butanediol from butadiene. It is also a byproduct of the catalytic hydrocracking of starches and sugars such as sorbitol to ethylene glycol and propylene glycol.

It can also be obtained from the dihydroxylation of but-1-ene by OsO4.

Applications
It has been patented for the production of polyester resins and plasticizers. It is a potential feedstock for the industrial production of α-ketobutyric acid, a precursor to some amino acids.

Safety
The LD50 (rats, oral) is 16g/kg.

Notes

References

External links

Alkanediols
Vicinal diols